Tsagaankhairkhan (white mountain) is the name of two sums (districts) in different aimags (provinces) of Mongolia:

 Tsagaankhairkhan, Uvs
 Tsagaankhairkhan, Zavkhan